Group Captain Cecil Chaudhry  (Urdu:سیسل چودھری) (27 August 1941 – 13 April 2012) was a Pakistani academic, human rights activist, and a veteran fighter pilot. As a flight lieutenant, he fought in the Indo-Pakistani War of 1965 and as a squadron leader in the Indo-Pakistani War of 1971. During the 1965 war, Chaudhry and three other pilots, under the leadership of Wing Commander Anwar Shamim, attacked the Amritsar Radar Station in a difficult operation. He was awarded the Sitara-e-Jurat (Star of Courage) for his actions during that mission.

Early life and career
Chaudhry was born on 27 August 1941 to the only Christian (Roman Catholic) family of the village Dalwal, located in the Salt Range of Punjab, British India. His father, Elmer Chaudhry, hailing from East Punjab and then based in Lahore, was chief photographer with The Times, Lahore, as well as a physics and mathematics teacher at St. Anthony's High School. Cecil Chaudhry was schooled at St. Anthony's, before pursuing higher studies at the Forman Christian College, Lahore where he received his B.S. in physics.

As an Air Scout, he was awarded his glider pilot’s wings in 1956 by the then President of Pakistan, Iskander Mirza, at a ceremony in Karachi. He was admitted into the Pakistan Air Force Academy on 12 March 1958 and enrolled in the engineering program. In 1960, he received his double BSc in aeronautics and mechanical engineering along with becoming an ace fighter pilot upon graduating from the PAF Academy. After nearly 28 years of service, he retired from the Pakistan Air Force in 1986.

Later life
Cecil Chaudhry became an educationist after leaving the air force and was affiliated with the Punjab Education Foundation. He served as principal of St. Anthony's College for many years, before becoming principal of Saint Mary's Academy, Lalazar, Rawalpindi, succeeding Sister Eileen Ann Daffy. He retired from this post in July 2011.

Chaudhry remained an influential, independent human rights activist, as well as working for the betterment of children with disabilities and for educational reform. He advised and worked closely with the late Shahbaz Bhatti from the early 1990s onwards and had been Executive Secretary of the All Pakistan Minorities Alliance (APMA) since its inception. He was also affiliated with the National Commission for Justice and Peace and was instrumental in leading the fourteen-year campaign that led to the restoration of Pakistan's joint electorate system in 2002.

Awards and decorations

Death and legacy
Cecil Chaudhry died at the age of 70 in Lahore on 13 April 2012 after a battle with lung cancer. He was buried with full military honors at the Jail Road's Christian Cemetery in Lahore, Pakistan. His daughter, Michelle Chaudhry, founded the Cecil & Iris Chaudhry Foundation, an NGO active in the defence of minorities in Pakistan, in his memory. Among his survivors were three daughters and a son.

See also
 Mervyn Middlecoat

References

External links
 

1941 births
2012 deaths
Pakistan Air Force officers
Pakistani military engineers
Pakistani flying aces
Pilots of the Indo-Pakistani War of 1965
Pakistani military personnel of the Indo-Pakistani War of 1971
Pakistani Christians
Pakistani Roman Catholics
Recipients of Sitara-e-Jurat
Recipients of the Pride of Performance
Deaths from lung cancer
People from Chakwal District
Forman Christian College alumni
People from Lahore
Military personnel from Lahore
Deaths from cancer in Pakistan
St. Anthony's High School, Lahore alumni
Pakistani test pilots
Pakistani social workers